"I Thought It Was You" is a song written by Tim Mensy and Gary Harrison, and recorded by American country music singer Doug Stone.  It was released in July 1991 as the first single and title track from his album of the same name.  It was a number 4 country hit for him in the United States, and a number 1 in Canada.

Content
"I Thought It Was You" is a mid-tempo ballad in which the male narrator mistakes other people that he sees for his former lover. Each time, he says, "I thought it was you" of the mistaken identity. He elaborates on this line in the chorus with the line "I hear there's one special love in each life, and I must look like a fool / I thought it was you."

Chart positions

Year-end charts

References

1991 singles
Doug Stone songs
Songs written by Tim Menzies
Epic Records singles
Songs written by Gary Harrison
Song recordings produced by Doug Johnson (record producer)
1991 songs